The 2006 League of Ireland First Division season was the 22nd season of the League of Ireland First Division. The First Division was contested by 10 teams and Shamrock Rovers won the division. Each team played the other teams four times, totalling 36 games.

Club information

Overview
In March 2006 it was announced that the League of Ireland and the Football Association of Ireland would be merging. As part of this arrangement the league would be restructured and membership of the 2007 Premier Division and 2007 First Division would be decided by an Independent Assessment Group chaired by a former FAI honorary secretary, Des Casey. Clubs would be assessed on their past five season record in the league. Crucially though, clubs would also be graded on off-field criteria, including attendance, infrastructure, governance, strategic planning, finance, youth development and marketing. This decision would have a considerable impact on the 2006 First Division which began on March 10 and finished on November 18. The season developed into three-way battle between Shamrock Rovers, Dundalk and Galway United. Shamrock Rovers eventually emerged as champions while Dundalk finished second and went on to defeat Waterford United in a promotion/relegation play-off. However it was subsequently announced that Dundalk had failed to meet the Independent Assessment Group criteria and they would not be promoted to the Premier Division and that third placed Galway United would be promoted instead. The decision proved to be controversial and Dundalk were particularly aggrieved. On 13 December, Mark Kavanagh, a Dundalk fan protesting the decision entered the FAI's headquarters in Merrion Square and allegedly threatened to set himself on fire after pouring petrol on his head and on furniture in the offices and reception area. He gave up the protest after obtaining a meeting with Dundalk manager John Gill. Dundalk eventually accepted the FAI decision and remained in the First Division.

Final table

Promotion/relegation play-off
Dundalk who finished second played off against Waterford United who finished eleventh in the Premier Division.
1st Leg

2nd Leg

Dundalk won 3–2 on aggregate but did not meet the criteria set out by the FAI's Independent Assessment Group and were not promoted.

IAG table

Notes

Top scorers

Gallery

See also
 2006 League of Ireland Premier Division
 2006 League of Ireland Cup

References

 
League of Ireland First Division seasons
2006 League of Ireland
2006 in Republic of Ireland association football leagues
Ireland
Ireland